Abdel-Wahhab Tawaf is a Yemeni diplomat. He quit his position as ambassador to Syria over the 2011 Yemeni uprising.

References

21st-century Yemeni diplomats
Ambassadors of Yemen to Syria
Living people
Year of birth missing (living people)
Place of birth missing (living people)